St Mark's Church is an active Anglican church in Darling Point, a suburb of Sydney, New South Wales, Australia. It is part of a significant local heritage group that includes the church, rectory, and adjacent cottage. The group forms part of a large collection of important to late 19th century buildings of considerable townscape, historic and cultural significance, including the former St Mark's Crescent School, St Mark's Cottage and Bishopscourt, formerly Greenoaks.

History
Constructed between 1848 and 1880, St Mark's Church was designed by Colonial Architect to New South Wales, Edmund Blacket, in an early Victorian Rustic Gothic Revival style with nave, chancel, vestries, organ chamber, tower and spire; made of Sydney sandstone with hardwood timber shingled roofs. The church was completed in 1854 with the spire, a gift from William Laidley, added later. In 1861 the church was extended to the west to include the porch and gallery. Prior to completion of this building, accommodation for worshippers in this section of the parish of Alexandria was provided by Thomas Ware Smart of Mona, who converted one of his cottages in Mona Lane in the Chapel of St Mark. In 1863 Wolliam Bradley of Lindesay built at his expense, the present vestries.

St Mark's Church is one of the best known Anglican parish churches in Australia and has become a popular wedding venue hosting such famous weddings as Elton John's first marriage and the fictional wedding in the film Muriel's Wedding. Social photographer Sam Hood captured many socialite weddings during the 1930s.

Leadership

The current rector, since 2013, is Rev. Dr Michael Jensen, a son of the former archbishop of Sydney, The Most Reverend Peter Jensen.

See also

 List of Anglican churches in the Diocese of Sydney
 Anglican Diocese of Sydney

References

Attribution 
 This Wikipedia article was originally based on the St Marks Anglican church, the Rectory of St Marks church, and the St Marks Cottage - building, sandstone retaining walls, all listed on the "New South Wales State Heritage Register" published by the Government of New South Wales under CC-BY 3.0 AU licence (accessed on 19 March 2018).

Anglican Diocese of Sydney
New South Wales Heritage Database
Churches completed in 1854
Anglican church buildings in Sydney
Edmund Blacket buildings in Sydney
1854 establishments in Australia
Edmund Blacket church buildings
Darling Point
Elton John
Darling Point, New South Wales
Gothic Revival church buildings in Australia